Dwayne Anderson II (born June 22, 1986) is a former American professional basketball player and basketball coach. He last played for S.Oliver Baskets in the German Basketball League. He played college basketball, as both a forward and a guard at Villanova University, in Pennsylvania.

Early life
Anderson was born on June 22, 1986 in Washington, D.C., to Dwayne Anderson Sr. and Michelle Anderson. He has two younger brothers, David and Darian.

High school
Anderson was originally educated at St. John's College High School in Washington, D.C. While a junior, he averaged 19.7 points per game. One of his teammates, Dante Cunningham, would later play at Villanova with Anderson. He would graduate there and play a graduate year at St. Thomas More.

College

Freshman
At Villanova University, Anderson saw action in 14 games during his freshman year. His collegiate debut was an 86–57 victory over Stony Brook University on November 30. Anderson racked up three points in seven minutes of play in the opening win. In a game against La Salle on December 22, he recorded a season-high ten points while playing seven minutes off the bench. Villanova won by a score of 98–57. Overall Anderson averaged 1.5 points and 3.9 minutes per game.

Sophomore
Anderson was again lightly regarded for his sophomore year.

Junior
In the 30 games that he played, Anderson scored an average of 6.5 points per game, with six games in double figures. He also grabbed 4.8 rebounds per game and stole the ball 44 times, the team's third best. He started in the last 14 games of the season, giving Villanova a 9–5 record with him on the starting lineup. Of his 145 attempts from the field, Anderson made 73, averaging a field goal percentage of .503. Shot 62.8% from the free throw line, and 31.8% from three. In his first start, Anderson sunk a three-pointer with 13 seconds left to give Villanova a 72–70 win over Seton Hall.

Senior
On November 14, 2008, the Villanova Wildcats announced that Anderson was forced to miss an indefinite number of games due to a fractured left foot. He went on to miss the inaugural seven games, though was back to play Houston Baptist University. Villanova blew them out 93–57.
Upon his return, Anderson helped lead Villanova to the 2009 Final Four in Detroit, where the Wildcats lost to eventual champion North Carolina.

Professional career
In summer of 2009 he signed with BG Göttingen in Germany, where he played for two seasons. Next, Anderson moved his talents to Italy, where he played for Piacenza for the 2011–2012 season. In August 2012, Anderson chose to return to Germany and signed with the S.Oliver Baskets in the German Basketball League. He averaged 13.35 points per game and 7.2 rebounds per game, and was named to his second All Star team.

Coaching career
In 2013, he was named an assistant coach at Penn State University.

In 2018, Anderson returned to Villanova to become director of basketball operations.

References

External links
German League profile
Villanova athletic bio

1986 births
Living people
American expatriate basketball people in Germany
American expatriate basketball people in Italy
Basketball players from Washington, D.C.
BG Göttingen players
Penn State Nittany Lions basketball coaches
Shooting guards
Small forwards
S.Oliver Würzburg players
Villanova Wildcats men's basketball players
American men's basketball players